Gov. H. Guy Kump House is a historic home located at Elkins, Randolph County, West Virginia.  It was designed by noted Washington, D.C.-architect Clarence L. Harding and built in 1924–1925, as a home for West Virginia Governor Herman G. Kump (1877–1962) and his wife Edna Hall Scott Kump (1887–1957).  It is a -story, 42 foot square, red brick dwelling with a steeply pitched, slate covered gable roof.  The front facade features a shallow Doric order entrance portico and it has a porte cochere and sun porch.  The house is in a Neo-Federal Revival style with Neo-Georgian Revival elements.  In 2008, the house was willed to the city of Elkins.

It was listed on the National Register of Historic Places in 1983.

References

Houses on the National Register of Historic Places in West Virginia
Federal architecture in West Virginia
Georgian Revival architecture in West Virginia
Houses completed in 1924
Houses in Randolph County, West Virginia
National Register of Historic Places in Randolph County, West Virginia
Colonial Revival architecture in West Virginia